Below are the reservoirs (artificial lakes) in the world with a surface area exceeding . Reservoirs can also be formed by damming the outlets of natural lakes to regulate water levels, such as ones at Uganda's Owen Falls Dam (Lake Victoria) and Russia's Irkutsk Dam (Lake Baikal); they are included here and indicated with a light blue cell background.

Large reservoir area does not necessarily coincide with large volume, as reservoirs with a large area tend to be shallow, such as at Suriname's  Brokopondo Reservoir, with an average depth of just .

List

See also
List of reservoirs by volume

Notes

References

Lists by area
Largest things by area
Lists of bodies of water

de:Liste der größten Stauseen der Erde